Johnathan Lamar Sullivan (born January 21, 1981) is a former American football defensive tackle who played in the National Football League (NFL). He played college football at Georgia and was drafted sixth overall by the New Orleans Saints in the 2003 NFL Draft.

The New England Patriots acquired Sullivan in a trade with New Orleans in June 2006 in exchange for wide receiver Bethel Johnson and then released him on October 9, 2006. He did not play a down for the Patriots and was waived on October 9, 2006.

On June 26, 2006, Sullivan was stopped by police near Atlanta and charged with possession of less than an ounce of marijuana, among other charges.

References

1981 births
Living people
American football defensive tackles
Georgia Bulldogs football players
New Orleans Saints players
New England Patriots players
People from Griffin, Georgia
Players of American football from Georgia (U.S. state)